Sebastian Kolowa Memorial University (SEKOMU) is a private university in Lushoto, Tanzania. It has three faculties: Education, Science, and Law.

Besides the teaching at the main campus, the university provides courses at Tanga Training Center (TC) and Bumbuli Clinical Officer Training Center (COTC).

References

External links
 

Private universities in Tanzania
Universities in Tanga
Educational institutions established in 2012
2012 establishments in Tanzania